Somerville railway station is located on the Stony Point line in Victoria, Australia. It serves the town of Somerville, and it opened on 10 September 1889.

History

Somerville station opened on 10 September 1889, when the railway line from Baxter was extended to Hastings. Like the town itself, the station was named after Sir William Meredyth Somerville, an Anglo-Irish Member of Parliament for Drogheda between 1837-1852, and Canterbury, between 1854-1865.

The station opened due to rapid growth in the fruit (apples and pears) and dairy industries. The dairy industry needed a quick way of sending milk and cream to butter factories.

When the railway line reached Somerville, the station was a mile or so from the school and hall, which at the time was located on Lower Somerville Road. The town centre moved from there to its current site.

Somerville station also operated as a post and telegraph office in the early years, and was a centre where people met as they collected their mail. The investment in special railway sidings, servicing new packing sheds and cool stores, over a period of six years from 1914 to 1920, created expansion in the apple and pear growing industry. The advent of iced T wagons made it possible to load chilled fruit for quick transport to Melbourne docks, and load directly into refrigerated ships for overseas destinations.

Up until the end of World War II, a special train ran to the horticultural show at Somerville, which was reputed to be one of the biggest of its kind in Australia. The railway line also helped the fruit tree nurseries, and family-operated companies, such as Brunnings, Shepherds, Unthanks, Coles and Grants. They sent hundreds of thousands of bare-rooted trees all over Australia, to the Goulburn Valley, the Murray Valley, and Sunraysia areas in Victoria, the Riverina districts of New South Wales, and to the Granite Belt area, centred on Stanthorpe in Queensland. This traffic was seasonal, and took place from May to September.

The station building that stood on the platform at Somerville was portable, meaning that it was delivered in sections and bolted together. The building contained an office and a safe working area, from which the staff and ticket system was operated. There was a van shed for small goods and parcels, two waiting rooms, one for the ladies and a general waiting room, and toilets. This building existed until February 1986, when it was replaced with the current aluminium building. In the station yard, there was a general goods shed, a loading ramp, a crane, and a livestock loading facility. Later, two sidings were built for the Somerville Co-operative Cool Stores. By 2008, the Up end connection to the yard was removed.

The station master's house was located at the Frankston-Flinders Road entrance to the station. Unfortunately, two Somerville youths set fire to the house during August 2009. The house was completely destroyed, and the youths were apprehended.

The station was usually staffed by the station master, but on occasions over the years, he was assisted by a lad porter or assistant station master from Baxter. Somerville was the banking station for all stations to Stony Point, and supplied some of them with stores and stationery. Safeworking was originally the staff and ticketing system, but this was varied from time to time, until the opening of the Long Island sidings, when the electric staff system was introduced.

In 1961, flashing light signals were provided at the Eramosa Road level crossing, located nearby in the Up direction of the station.

On 22 June 1981, the passenger service between Frankston and Stony Point was withdrawn and replaced with a bus service. On 16 September 1984, promotional trips for the reopening of the line began and, on 27 September of that year, the passenger service was reinstated.

In 1991, boom barriers were provided at the Eramosa Road level crossing.

Platforms and services

Somerville has one platform. It is serviced by Metro Trains' Stony Point line services.

Platform 1:
  all stations services to Frankston; all stations services to Stony Point

Transport links

Ventura Bus Lines operates two routes via Somerville station, under contract to Public Transport Victoria:
 : Frankston station – Flinders
 : Frankston station – Hastings

References

External links
 Melway map at street-directory.com.au

Railway stations in Melbourne
Railway stations in Australia opened in 1889
Railway stations in the Shire of Mornington Peninsula